Bob Dole has unsuccessfully run for president thrice:

 Bob Dole 1980 presidential campaign, the failed campaign Bob Dole conducted in 1980
 Bob Dole 1988 presidential campaign, the failed campaign Bob Dole conducted in 1988
 Bob Dole 1996 presidential campaign